Gerald Van Woerkom was a Republican member of both houses of the Michigan Legislature between 1999 and 2010.

Born April 3, 1947 in Grand Haven, Van Woerkom received his bachelor's degree in world history from Calvin College and a master's degree in education from the University of Michigan. He was involved in various capacities in Christian schools in Michigan for nearly 30 years, including as the superintendent of Muskegon Christian Schools from 1994 through 1997. He was also involved in the Muskegon County Local Emergency Planning Committee, the Muskegon Lake Public Advisory Committee, and the White Lake Public Advisory Committee.

Van Woerkom was elected to the Michigan House of Representatives in 1998 and served two terms. He won election to the Michigan Senate and served from 2003 through 2010.

References

1947 births
Living people
People from Grand Haven, Michigan
Calvin University alumni
University of Michigan School of Education alumni
Republican Party members of the Michigan House of Representatives
Republican Party Michigan state senators
20th-century American politicians
21st-century American politicians